William Thomas Smith (9 April 1897 – after 1924) was an English professional footballer.

Career
During his amateur career, Smith played in 17 finals, and captained the Third Army team in Germany when he was stationed in Koblenz after the armistice during the First World War. He started his professional career with Hull City in 1921. After making no appearances for the club, he joined Leadgate Park. He joined Durham City in 1921, making 33 league appearances in the club's first season in the Football League.

He joined York City in the Midland League in July 1922, where he scored the club's first goal in that competition. He made 75 appearances for the club in the Midland League and five appearances in the FA Cup before joining Stockport County in 1925, where he made no league appearances.

References

1897 births
Year of death missing
English footballers
Association football midfielders
Hull City A.F.C. players
Leadgate Park F.C. players
Durham City A.F.C. players
York City F.C. players
Stockport County F.C. players
English Football League players
Midland Football League players
People from Langley Park, County Durham
Footballers from County Durham